B. gracilis may refer to:

 Bacteroides gracilis, a species of gram negative anaerobic bacterium
 Barbilophozia gracilis, a liverwort species in the genus Barbilophozia
 Bathysauropsis gracilis, the black lizardfish, a grinner
 Belonolaimus gracilis, the pine sting nematode, a plant pathogenic nematode
 Bletia gracilis, a species of orchid
 Bolitoglossa gracilis, a species of salamander in the family Plethodontidae endemic to Costa Rica
 Bomarea gracilis, a species of plant in the family Alstroemeriaceae endemic to Ecuador
 Bouteloua gracilis, the blue grama, a long-lived, warm season, C4 perennial grass
 Brunneria gracilis, a species of praying mantis found in Argentina, Brazil, Paraguay, Uruguay and Venezuela

Synonyms
 Barosaurus gracilis, a synonym for Tornieria gracilis, a sauropod dinosaur from Late Jurassic Tanzania

See also
 Gracilis (disambiguation)